The Arboretum du Ru de Rôge is an arboretum located in Blanzey, southeast of Fougerolles, Haute-Saône, Franche-Comté, France. The arboretum was established in 1996 with plantings conducted 1997–1998. It now contains nearly 60 species of trees with walking paths, and is open daily without charge.

See also 
 List of botanical gardens in France

References 
 Arboretum du Ru de Rôge
 Le sentier des Pierres de Rôge
 A map of the area
 La Haute Saone - Fougerolles

Gardens in Haute-Saône
Ru de Roge